"I Want You" is a song by Italo disco singer Gary Low, released as a single in 1983, from his debut album, Go On. It was a hit in Spain, reaching No. 4 on the Spanish chart. In Germany, the song made the top 40, peaking at No. 37. In the UK, the song reached No. 52. "I Want You" is one of Low's most popular songs, alongside his 1982 debut hit "You Are a Danger" and 1984's "La Colegiala".

Track listing
A. "I Want You" (Vocal) – 8:30
B. "I Want You" (Instrumental) – 8:30

Charts

Sales and certifications

Samples
"I Want You" has been sampled on several songs such as "How We Are" by Dimitri & Tom (2001), "In My Eyes" by Sinema (2002), "The Beach" by Miss Kittin & The Hacker (2003), and on "Feel It All Around" by Washed Out (2009) which was used as the opening theme song of the television series Portlandia.

Appearances in media
"I Want You" can be heard during a scene in the 1985 VIVA film Working Boys which stars Tito, Vic & Joey and Herbert Bautista.

References

1982 songs
1983 singles
Gary Low songs